Naouirou Ahamada (born 29 March 2002) is a French professional footballer who plays as a midfielder for Premier League club Crystal Palace.

Club career
On 5 October 2020, VfB Stuttgart signed Ahamada on loan until the end of the season with an option to buy. On 1 July 2021, the option was exercised and the club signed him permanently.

On 31 January 2023, Ahamada was signed on a three-and-a-half year deal by Premier League club Crystal Palace for £9.7 million. He made his debut for the club on 4 February, coming on as a substitute for Cheick Doucouré in a 2–1 away loss to Manchester United.

International career
Ahamada was born in France and is of Comorian and Malagasy descent. He is a youth international for France.

Career statistics

References

External links
Profile at the Crystal Palace F.C. website

2002 births
Living people
Footballers from Marseille
French footballers
Association football midfielders
France youth international footballers
FC Istres players
Juventus F.C. players
Juventus Next Gen players
VfB Stuttgart players
Serie C players
Bundesliga players
Regionalliga players
French expatriate footballers
French expatriate sportspeople in Italy
Expatriate footballers in Italy
French expatriate sportspeople in Germany
Expatriate footballers in Germany
French sportspeople of Comorian descent
VfB Stuttgart II players
Crystal Palace F.C. players
Expatriate footballers in England